Creative Differences is a studio album by American hip hop group Living Legends. It was released in 2004. The album cover is a reference to The Brady Bunch. It peaked at number 28 on the Billboard Independent Albums chart.

Critical reception
Stewart Mason of AllMusic gave the album 4 stars out of 5, saying, "early De La Soul's pop-culture giggles, Digital Underground's playful rudeness, A Tribe Called Quest's cross-cultural fearlessness, Public Enemy's sonic fingerprints and the no-rules aesthetic of the Wu-Tang Clan are all touched upon at different points in this sprawling masterwork."

Track listing

Charts

References

External links
 

2004 albums
Living Legends albums
Albums produced by Eligh